Naumovela is a genus of fungi in the class Sordariomycetes. The relationship of this taxon to other taxa within the class is unknown (incertae sedis). According to the 2007 Outline of Ascomycota, the placement in this class is uncertain.

References

Sordariomycetes genera
Sordariomycetes enigmatic taxa